The YYCIX Internet Exchange Community Ltd (YYCIX) in Calgary, Canada is the first Internet exchange point (IXP) in Alberta. It allows the local exchange of Internet traffic between members, staying within Canadian jurisdiction, optimizing the performance and economy of traffic flows, and limiting the potential for extra-legal surveillance.
The YYCIX follows IXP best-practices, in that it is neutral and independent, has no mandatory fees, and is supported entirely through voluntary donations. The YYCIX is incorporated as a Canadian tax-exempt non-profit corporation.

Technology

The YYCIX is currently running on a variety of Cisco equipment, supporting speeds of 1Gbit/s on copper, or 1Gbit/s to 100Gbit/s on fiber. The YYCIX provides NTP and an optional BGP route reflectors for multilateral peering.

Both IPv4 and IPv6 peering is possible and encouraged at the YYCIX.

Availability

YYCIX is currently available in the following locations in Calgary:

DataHive - Data Centre
 Suite 300, 840 – 7th Avenue SW, Calgary, Alberta
 Signed a Memorandum of Understanding which provides no-cost cross-connects to members inside its data centre 
 Colocation, many carriers, Hurricane Electric
 YYCIX switch ports: 1G/10/25/40/100G SM/MM

Q9 Calgary Three - Data Centre
 5300 86 Ave SE, Calgary, Alberta
 Colocation, many carriers
 YYCIX switch ports: 1G/10G/25G/40G/100G SM/MM

Shaw (ViaWest Calgary) - Data Centre
 7007 69 Ave SE, Calgary, Alberta
 Colocation, many carriers
 YYCIX switch ports: 1G/10G/25G/40G/100G SM/MM

Arrow Calgary - Data Centre
 330 - 840 7th Ave SW 
 Colocation, interconnects to Telecom
 YYCIX switch ports: 1G/10/25/40/100 SM/MM

City of Calgary - City Hall
 City of Calgary, 800 Macleod Trail SE, Calgary, Alberta
 No colocation permitted, only provides circuit connects to YYCIX
 YYCIX switch ports: 1G/10G/25G/40G/100G SM/MM

Rogers DC2
 1313 10th Ave SW
 Colocation, interconnects to Telecom
 YYCIX switch ports: 1G/10/25/40/100 SM

See also 
 List of Internet exchange points

References

External links
 Official Website
 Current Peers

Internet exchange points in Canada
Network access